Kalil ElMedkhar (born August 18, 1999) is an American soccer player who currently plays for Loudoun United FC in the USL Championship.

Playing career

Youth
ElMedkhar joined the Philadelphia Union YSC Academy in 2013, where he played for five years.

College and amateur
In 2017, ElMedkhar attended the University of Kentucky to play college soccer. In four seasons with the Wilcats, ElMedkhar made 66 appearances, scoring 20 goals and tallying 21 assists. Accolades earned during his time in college saw ElMedkhar named to United Soccer Coaches All-Southeast Region First Team and All-C-USA First Team in 2018 and 2019, as well as to the C-USA Commissioner's Honor Roll and Fall SEC Academic Honor Roll in 2019. Prior to the start of his junior year season, ElMedkhar was also named C-USA Preseason Co-Offensive Player of the Year, to the MAC Hermann Trophy Watch List and the C-USA Preseason Team.

ElMedkhar also appeared for USL League Two side Reading United AC in both 2018 and 2019, making 22 appearances and scoring 5 goals across the regular season and playoffs.

Professional
On January 14, 2021, ElMedkhar signed a two-year deal with MLS side FC Dallas after Dallas acquired his homegrown player rights from Philadelphia Union in exchange for $50,000 of General Allocation Money, with further Allocation Money dependence on ElMedkhar meeting certain performance metrics.

He made his professional debut on May 8, 2021, starting for Dallas's USL League One affiliate side North Texas SC against Chattanooga Red Wolves in a 1–0 loss.

Following the 2022 season, ElMedkhar's contract option was declined by Dallas.

On January 12, 2023, ElMedkhar signed with D.C. United affiliate club Loudoun United.

Personal
ElMedkhar was born in Delaware in the United States, but also holds Syrian citizenship as his father emigrated from Syria to study medicine at the University of Delaware.

References 

1999 births
American soccer players
American people of Syrian descent
Association football midfielders
FC Dallas players
Homegrown Players (MLS)
Kentucky Wildcats men's soccer players
Living people
North Texas SC players
Loudoun United FC players
People from Middletown, Delaware
Reading United A.C. players
Soccer players from Delaware
USL League One players
USL League Two players
Major League Soccer players